The Biotechnology Heritage Award recognizes individuals who have made significant contributions to the development of biotechnology through discovery, innovation, and public understanding.  It is presented annually at the Biotechnology Innovation Organization (BIO) Annual International Convention by the Biotechnology Innovation Organization (BIO, formerly the Biotechnology Industry Organization) and the Science History Institute (formerly the Chemical Heritage Foundation). The purpose of the award is "to encourage emulation, inspire achievement, and promote public understanding of modern science, industry, and economics".

Recipients 
The award is given yearly and was first presented in 1999.
 Ivor Royston, 2020
 Janet Woodcock, 2019
 William Rastetter, 2018
 John C. Martin, 2017
 Stanley Norman Cohen, 2016
 Moshe Alafi and William K. Bowes, 2015
 Robert S. Langer, 2014
 George Rosenkranz, 2013 
 Nancy Chang, 2012
 Joshua S. Boger, 2011
 Arthur D. Levinson, 2010
 Robert T. Fraley, 2009
 Henri A. Termeer, 2008
 Ronald E. Cape, 2007
 Alejandro Zaffaroni, 2006
 Paul Berg, 2005
 Leroy Hood, 2004
 William J. Rutter, 2003
 Walter Gilbert, 2002
 Francis S. Collins and J. Craig Venter, 2001
 Herbert Boyer and Robert A. Swanson, 2000
 George B. Rathmann, 1999

Photo Gallery

See also

 List of biology awards

References

Biology awards
American awards
Awards established in 1999
1999 establishments in the United States